It's All Me, Vol. 2 (stylized IT'S ALL ME VOL 2) is an extended play by Japanese-American singer-songwriter Ai. It was released on February 24, 2021, through EMI Records, as a follow-up to It's All Me, Vol. 1 (2020). Ai primarily collaborated with western producers and longtime collaborator Julian Le.

The lead and only single "Not So Different" was released in November 2020 with a remix release featuring Awich in December 2020. "Hope" was released in January 2021 as a promotional single.

Background and release 
Celebrating her twenty-year anniversary in the music industry, Ai released a compilation album, Kansha!!!!! - Thank You for 20 Years New and Best in November 2019 and an extended play, It's All Me, Vol. 1 in July 2020. 

The EP's first single, "Not So Different" was released on November 25, 2020 with its music video premiering on the same day. In December 2020, Ai partnered with One Young World and released a special music video of the song in support of the project. A remix of "Not So Different" featuring Japanese rapper Awich was released on December 11, 2020 as a promotional single. The second single, "Hope" was released on January 30, 2021 with its music video premiering the same day. Ai partnered with deleteC, a non-profit organization in Japan aiming to support cancer treatment. A music video of the "Not So Different" remix was released on February 20, 2021, a few days prior to the EP's release on February 24.

Track listing

Personnel 
Credits adapted from album's liner notes and Tidal.

Musicians 

 Ai Carina Uemura – lead vocals, songwriting, production
 Julian Le – production
 Felisha "Fury" King – songwriting
 Fallon King – songwriting
 Bernard "Harv" Harvey – production
 Scott Storch – production, songwriting
 Blaq Tuxedo – production, songwriting
 Avedon – production, songwriting, remixing
 Rachel West – songwriting
 Akiko Urasaki – songwriting, featured artist
 Matt Cab – production
 Toma – production

Technical 

 D.O.I – mixing
 Mark Parfitt – vocal engineering
 Randy Merrill – mastering
 Keisuke Fujimaki – vocal engineering
 Kesiuke Suwa – vocal engineering
 Shiori Maruoka – vocal engineering
 Yuki Arai – executive producer
 Naoshi Fujikura – executive producer

Visuals and imagery 

 Ran Tondabayahsi – art director
 Yousuke Tsuchida – designer
 Hiroki Watanabe – photographer
 Moemi Odo – retouching
 Akemi Ono – hair, makeup artist
 Noriko Gota – stylist
 Akio Kawabata – design coordination
 Shuma Saito – design coordination

Chart performance 
It's All Me, Vol. 2 debuted and peaked at number 47 on the Japan Oricon weekly albums chart, charting for two weeks.

Release history

Notes

References 

Japanese-language EPs
2021 EPs
EPs by Japanese artists
Ai (singer) EPs
EMI Records EPs
Universal Music Group EPs
Albums produced by Scott Storch
Albums produced by Ai (singer)